Xu Qing, nicknamed "Mountain Rat" or "Mountain-Boring Rat" (穿山鼠), because he can quickly traverse mountain caves, is a fictional Song dynasty knight-errant from the 19th-century Chinese novels The Seven Heroes and Five Gallants and The Five Younger Gallants. Xu Qing is the third sworn brother of the "Five Rats", whose other members are Lu Fang, Han Zhang, Jiang Ping and Bai Yutang.

Originally a blacksmith, Xu Qing is a buffoonish character in the novel — crude, simple-minded, gluttonous and often sleepyheaded. However, he is also righteous, brave and very loyal to his brothers. Xu Qing is also muscular and a relatively good fighter. He eventually becomes a Rank 6 Commandant (校尉) under Judge Bao.

The Seven Heroes and Five Gallants characters
Fictional characters from Shanxi
Literary characters introduced in 1879